Andres Bernal Reyes Jr. (born May 11, 1950)  is the 177th Associate Justice of the Supreme Court of the Philippines. He was appointed by President Rodrigo Duterte replacing Associate Justice Bienvenido L. Reyes.

Works

Andres, the first Atenean law graduate appointed by Duterte, previously served the Metropolitan Trial Court of Makati, Regional Trial Court of San Mateo Rizal and started working as the Associate Justice of the appellate court in 1999.  In 2010, he was appointed as Presiding Justice of the Court of Appeals.

Personal life
Reyes is the son of Andres Reyes, Sr., a former Presiding Justice of the Court of Appeals during the Marcos era, and Minerva Bernal.

References

1950 births
Living people
Associate Justices of the Supreme Court of the Philippines
Justices of the Court of Appeals of the Philippines
Presiding Justices of the Court of Appeals of the Philippines
Ateneo de Manila University alumni